Jules Joseph, Baron d'Anethan (23 April 1803 – 8 October 1888) was a Belgian Catholic Party politician.

After serving as minister for Justice and Religion, D'Anethan was named the prime minister of Belgium and minister of Foreign Affairs by King Leopold II on 2 July 1870. During his term in office, d'Anethan was responsible for directing the Belgian reaction to the Franco-Prussian War.

D'Anethan and the king agreed a programme whereby the King's favoured military reforms—in particular the abolition of Remplacement conscription—would be implemented, along with an agreement not to institute electoral reforms. He served as Foreign and War minister in his own government.

D'Anethan was obliged to include in his cabinet ministers who were opposed to the abolition of Remplacement which led to conflicts with the King. A political crisis following his nomination of Pierre de Decker as governor of Limburg led to the resignation of d'Anethan's government.

He later served, from 1884 to 1885, as president of the Belgian Senate.

Honours 
 : Minister of State, by royal decree
 : Grand Cordon in the Order of Leopold
 : Knight Grand Cross in the Order of Christ.
 :  Knight Grand Cross in the Imperial Order of the Rose.
 : Knight Grand Cross in the Royal Guelphic Order
 : Grand Officer in the Most Exalted Royal Order of the White Elephant

References

Sources
 L. Plettinck, Biographie du baron J. J. d'Anethan, Brugge, 1899
 A. Cosemans, Jules Joseph d'Anethan, in: Biographie nationale de Belgique, T. XXIX, 1956, col. 93–96.

External links
 
 Jules D'Anethan in ODIS - Online Database for Intermediary Structures

|-

1803 births
1888 deaths
Politicians from Brussels
Belgian Roman Catholics
Barons of Belgium
Belgian Ministers of State
Politicians of Catholic political parties
Presidents of the Senate (Belgium)
Prime Ministers of Belgium
Foreign ministers of Belgium
Belgian Ministers of Defence
Grand Crosses of the Order of Christ (Portugal)